Emperor Huizong of Song (7 June 1082 – 4 June 1135), personal name Zhao Ji, was the eighth emperor of the Northern Song dynasty of China. He was also a very well-known calligrapher. Born as the 11th son of Emperor Shenzong, he ascended the throne in 1100 upon the death of his elder brother and predecessor, Emperor Zhezong, because Emperor Zhezong's only son died prematurely. He lived in luxury, sophistication and art in the first half of his life. In 1126, when the Jurchen-led Jin dynasty invaded the Song dynasty during the Jin–Song Wars, Emperor Huizong abdicated and passed on his throne to his eldest son, Zhao Huan who assumed the title Emperor Qinzong while Huizong assumed the honorary title of Taishang Huang (or "Retired Emperor"). The following year, the Song capital, Bianjing, was conquered by Jin forces in an event historically known as the Jingkang Incident. Emperor Huizong and Emperor Qinzong and the rest of their family were taken captive by the Jurchens and brought back to the Jin capital, Huiningfu in 1128. The Jurchen ruler, Emperor Taizong of Jin, gave the former Emperor Huizong a title, Duke Hunde (literally "Besotted Duke"), to humiliate him. After Zhao Gou, the only surviving son of Huizong to avoid capture by the Jin, declared himself as the dynasty's tenth emperor as Emperor Gaozong, the Jurchens used Huizong, Qinzong, and other imperial family members to put pressure on Gaozong and his court to surrender. Emperor Huizong died in Wuguo after spending about nine years in captivity.

Despite his incompetence in rulership, Emperor Huizong was known for his promotion of Taoism and talents in poetry, painting, calligraphy and music. He sponsored numerous artists at his imperial court, and the catalogue of his collection listed over 6,000 known paintings.

Biography
Emperor Huizong, besides his partaking in state affairs that favoured the reformist party that supported Wang Anshi's New Policies, was a cultured leader who spent much of his time admiring the arts. He was a collector of paintings, calligraphy, and antiques of previous dynasties, building huge collections of each for his amusement. He wrote poems of his own, was known as an avid painter, created his own calligraphy style, had interests in architecture and garden design, and even wrote treatises on medicine and Taoism. He assembled an entourage of painters that were first pre-screened in an examination to enter as official artists of the imperial court, and made reforms to court music. Like many learned men of his age, he was quite a polymath personality, and is even considered to be one of the greatest Chinese artists of all time. He constantly proclaimed legitimacy through cultural, religious, and artistic means. In 1106, he had artisans recast of the symbolic Nine Tripod Cauldrons to assert his authority. However, his reign would be forever scarred by the decisions made (by counsel he received) on handling foreign policy, as the end of his reign marked a period of disaster for the Song Empire.

Jurchen Invasion

When the Jurchens founded the Jin Dynasty and attacked the Liao dynasty to the north of the Song, the Song dynasty allied with the Jin Dynasty and attacked the Liao from the south in 1122. Led by Tong Guan, the Song army marched to the Song-Liao border and was stopped by the defensive forest that the Song had maintained since the reign of Emperor Taizu. In order to pass through, Tong Guan ordered the soldiers to clear the forest and continued the expedition into the Liao. This expedition succeeded in destroying the Liao, a longtime enemy of the Song. However, when the Jin attacked the Song a few years later, the Jin troops marched through a defenseless border and quickly gathered around the Song capital Kaifeng.

Abdication 

However, an even more formidable Jin dynasty enemy was now on the northern border. Not content with the annexation of the Liao domain, and perceiving the weakness of the Song army, the Jurchens soon declared war on their former ally, and by the beginning of 1126, the troops of the Jin "Western Vice-Marshal" Wolibu crossed the Yellow River and came in sight of Bianjing, the capital of the Song Empire. Realizing his mistakes, Huizong took the blame for everything that went wrong and was stricken with panic, Emperor Huizong intended to flee but was convinced by his officials to abdicate first and then flee. Huizong then feigned a stroke because Huizong in his words said that "I must use the excuse of illness. I am afraid of disorder breaking out." He then abdicated on 18 January 1126 in favour of his eldest son, Zhao Huan who is historically now known as Emperor Qinzong.

However, Qinzong sternly refused the throne, even pushing the robes off. Huizong, still feigning a stroke, wrote with his left hand "If you do not accept, you are unfilial." Qinzong said, "If I accept, then I am unfilial." Even when Huizong summoned his empress, Qinzong still declined until Huizong ordered his eunuchs to forcibly put him on the throne. Qinzong finally gave in eventually accepting the throne. Huizong then departed the capital to flee in the countryside.

Capture 

Overcoming the walls of Bianjing was a difficult undertaking for the Jurchen cavalry, and this, together with fierce resistance from some Song officials who had not totally lost their nerve, as Emperor Huizong had, and Qinzong giving a town, resulted in the Jurchens lifting the siege of Bianjing and returning north. The Song Empire, however, had to sign a humiliating treaty with the Jin Empire, agreeing to pay a colossal war indemnity and to give a tribute to the Jurchens every year. From 1126 until 1138, refugees from the Song Empire migrated south towards the Yangtze River. Huizong returned from the countryside and resumed his normal activities after hearing that the siege was lifted although he was effectively under house arrest by Qinzong.

But even such humiliating terms could not save the Song dynasty. Within a matter of months, the troops of both Jurchen vice-marshals, Wolibu and Nianhan, were back south again, and this time they were determined to overcome the walls of Bianjing after Qinzong wanted to form an Anti-Jin alliance with two Liao nobles who were actually on the Jurchens side. After a bitter siege, the Jurchens eventually entered Bianjing on 9 January 1127, and many days of looting, rapes, and massacre followed. Most of the entire imperial court and harem were captured by the Jurchens in an event known historically as the Jingkang Incident, and transported north, mostly to the Jin capital of Shangjing (in present-day Harbin). After Qinzong was captured, Emperor Huizong, was persuaded to turn himself in, however, they captured Huizong. When Huizong got to see Qinzong, they cried and hugged each other with Huizong stating "If you had listened to the old man, we would have avoided this disaster."

One of the many sons of Emperor Huizong, Zhao Gou was not present in Bianjing where he went to Southern China where, after many years of struggle, he would establish the Southern Song Dynasty, of which he was the first ruler, Emperor Gaozong.

Emperors Huizong and the former Emperor Qinzong were demoted to the rank of commoners by the Jurchens on 20 March 1127. Then on 10 May 1127, Emperor Huizong was deported to Heilongjiang, where he spent the last eight years of his life as a captive. In 1128, in a humiliating episode, the two former Song Emperors had to venerate the Jin ancestors at their shrine in Shangjing, wearing mourning dress. The Jurchen ruler, Emperor Taizong, granted the two former Song emperors degrading titles to humiliate them: Emperor Huizong was called "Duke Hunde" (literally "Besotted Duke") while Emperor Qinzong was called "Marquis Chonghun" (literally "Doubly Besotted Marquis").

The Song male Chinese princes who were captured were given Khitan women to marry from the Liao dynasty palace by the Jin Jurchens, who had also defeated and conquered the Khitan. The original Chinese wives of the Song princes were confiscated and replaced with Khitan ones. One of the Song Emperor Huizong's sons was given a Khitan consort from the Liao palace and another one of his sons was given a Khitan princess by the Jin at the Jin Supreme capital. The Jin Jurchens continued to give new wives to the captured Song royals, the grandsons and sons of Song Emperor Huizong after they took away their original Chinese wives. The Jin Jurchens told the Chinese Song royals that they were fortunate because the Liao Khitan royals were being treated much worse by the Jurchen than the Song Chinese royals. Jurchen soldiers were given the children of the Liao Khitan Tianzuo Emperor as gifts while the Song Emperor was allowed to keep his children while he was in captivity.

In 1137, the Jin Empire formally notified the Southern Song Empire about the death of the former Emperor Huizong. Emperor Huizong, who had lived in opulence and art for the first half of his life, died a broken man in faraway northern Heilongjiang in June 1135, at the age of 52.

A few years later (1141), as the peace negotiations leading up to the Treaty of Shaoxing between the Jin and the Song empires were proceeding, the Jin Empire posthumously honored the former Emperor Huizong with the neutral-sounding title of "Prince of Tianshui Commandery", after a commandery Tianshui in the upper reaches of the Wei River, which is the traditional Junwang (郡望, zh) of the surname Zhao.

Art, calligraphy, music, and culture

Emperor Huizong was a great painter, poet, and calligrapher. He was also a player of the guqin (as exemplified by his famous painting 聽琴圖 Listening to the Qin); he also had a Wanqin Tang (萬琴堂; "10,000 Qin Hall") in his palace.

The emperor took huge efforts to search for art masters. He established the "Hanlin Huayuan" (翰林畫院; "Hanlin imperial painting house") where top painters around China shared their best works.

The primary subjects of his paintings are birds and flowers. Among his works is Five-Colored Parakeet on Blossoming Apricot Tree. He also recopied Zhang Xuan's painting Court Ladies Preparing Newly Woven Silk, and Emperor Huizong's reproduction is the only copy of that painting that survives today.

Emperor Huizong invented the "Slender Gold" style of calligraphy. The name "Slender Gold" came from the fact that the emperor's writing resembled gold filament, twisted and turned, also inspired by Li Yu who called his calligraphy "Golden Inlaid Dagger" (金錯刀). Some theories posits his technique probably based on calligraphy works by Chu Suiliang, Xue Ji or Huang Tingjian.

One of the emperor's era names, Xuanhe, is also used to describe a style of mounting paintings in scroll format. In this style, black borders are added between some of the silk planes.

In 1114, following a request from the Goryeo ruler Yejong, Emperor Huizong sent to the palace in the Goryeo capital at Gaeseong a set of musical instruments to be used for royal banquet music. Two years later, in 1116, he sent another, even larger gift of musical instruments (numbering 428 in total) to the Goryeo court, this time yayue instruments, beginning that nation's tradition of aak.

Emperor Huizong was also a great tea enthusiast. He wrote the Treatise on Tea, the most detailed and masterful description of the Song sophisticated style of tea ceremony.

Emperor Huizong's famous descendant was Zhao Mengfu through his daughter Zhao Jinluo.

Legacy
The painter Zeng Fanzhi regards Listening to the Qin as "the most beautiful painting from the Song dynasty. For more than 10 years, I’ve been observing the beauty of the pine tree in that painting."

Family
Consorts and Issue:
 Empress Xiangong, of the Wang clan (1084–1108)
 Zhao Huan, Qinzong (1100–1156), first son
 Princess Rongde (b. 1103), personal name Jinnu, second (second) daughter
 Married Cao Cheng (1104–1127) in 1115
 Married Wanyan Chang (d. 1139) in 1127
 Married Wanyan Dan (1119–1150) in 1139
 Empress Xiansu, of the Zheng clan (1079–1131)
 Princess Jiade (1100–1141), personal name Yupan, first (first) daughter
 Married Ceng Yin (b. 1100) in 1115, and had issue (two daughters)
 Married Wanyan Zongpan (d. 1139), the first son of Wanyan Sheng, in 1127
 Married Wanyan Dan (1119–1150) in 1139
 Zhao Cheng, Prince Yan (1101), second son
 Princess Shoushu, fourth daughter
 Princess Ande (1106–1127), personal name Jinluo, eighth (third) daughter
 Married Song Bangguang (b. 1106), and had issue (one daughter)
 Married Wanyan Dumu (1090–1129), the 11th son of Wanyan Helibo, in 1127
 Princess Rongshu, 11th daughter
 Princess Chengde (b. 1110), personal name Hu'er, 13th (fifth) daughter
 Married Xiang Zifang (b. 1110)
 Empress Mingda, of the Liu clan (d. 1113)
 Princess Anshu, sixth daughter
 Princess Maode (1106–1128), personal name Fujin, ninth (fourth) daughter
 Married Cai Tiao (b. 1107), the fifth son of Cai Jing, in 1120, and had issue (one son)
 Married Wanyan Zongwang (d. 1127), the second son of Wanyan Min, in 1127
 Married Wanyan Xiyin (d. 1140) in 1127
 Zhao Yu, Prince Yi (1107–1137), eighth son
 Zhao Mo, Prince Qi (1107–1138), 11th son
 Princess Xunde (b. 1110), personal name Fujin, 14th (sixth) daughter
 Married Tian Pi (b. 1110)
 Married Wanyan Sheyema, the first son of Wanyan Zonghan, in 1127
 Zhao Zhen, Prince Xin (1111–1139), 18th son
 Empress Mingjie, of the Liu clan (1088–1121)
 Zhao Yang, Prince Jian'an (1115–1127), 25th son
 Princess Hefu (b. 1116), personal name Jinzhu, 29th (17th) daughter
 Zhao Yi, Duke Jia (1118–1130), 26th son
 Zhao Si, Duke Ying (b. 1120), 28th son
 Empress Xianren, of the Wei clan (1080–1159)
 Zhao Gou, Gaozong (1111–1187), ninth son
 Noble Consort Yisu, of the Wang clan (d. 1117)
 Princess Huishu, fifth daughter
 Princess Kangshu, tenth daughter
 Zhao Zhi, Prince Shen (1108–1148), 12th son
 Princess Roufu (1111–1142), personal name Huanhuan, 20th (tenth) daughter
 Married Wanyan Zongwang (d. 1127), the second son of Wanyan Min, in 1127
 Married Wanyan Zongxian (d. 1150) in 1127
 Married Wanyan Sheng (1075–1135) in 1127
 Married Wanyan Zongxian (d. 1150)
 Married Xu Hai
 Princess Xianfu (1112–1127), personal name Jin'er, 26th (15th) daughter
 Zhao Ji, Duke Chen (1114), 22nd son
 Noble Consort, of the Wang clan
 Zhao Kai, Prince Yun (1101–1130), third son
 Princess Chongde (d. 1121), seventh daughter
 Married Cao Shi in 1119
 Princess Baoshu, 12th daughter
 Princess Xishu, 16th daughter
 Zhao Chan, Duke Xiang (1112–1137), 23rd son
 Noble Consort, of the Qiao clan (b. 1081)
 Zhao Qi, Prince Jing (1104–1138), sixth son
 Zhao Xu, Prince Ji (b. 1106), seventh son
 Noble Consort, of the Cui clan (1091–1130)
 Princess Daomu, personal name Jinxian, 15th daughter
 Princess Dunfu, personal name Sanjin, 21st daughter
 Zhao Chun, Prince Han (1112–1113), 19th son
 Princess Renfu (1112–1127), personal name Xiangyun, 23rd (12th) daughter
 Princess Yongfu (b. 1112), personal name Fubao, 25th (14th) daughter
 Princess Ningfu (b. 1114), personal name Chuanzhu, 28th (16th) daughter
 Married Wanyan Zongjuan (d. 1139), the sixth son of Wanyan Min, in 1127, and had issue (one son)
 Married Wanyan Dan (1119–1150) in 1139
 Noble Consort, of the Wang clan (1092–1127)
 Zhao E, Prince Yi (1110–1132), 15th son
 Princess Shenfu, 27th daughter
 Worthy Consort, of the Yang clan (d. 1115)
 Princess Shunshu, third daughter
 Zhao Shi, Prince He (1111–1128), 17th son
 Wanrong, of the Wang clan, personal name Yuegong (王月宮)
 Princess Huifu (b. 1112), personal name Zhuzhu, 24th (13th) daughter
 Married Wanyan Xiebao, the second son of Wanyan Zonghan, in 1127, and had issue (one son)
 Wanrong, of the Yan clan (1109–1133), personal name Baose
 Zhao Zhu (b. 1130), 34th son
 Zhaoyuan, of the Zheng clan, personal name Meiniang
 Zhao Tan (b. 1131), 35th son
 Xiurong, of the Han clan
 Princess Baofu (1112–1127), personal name Xianlang, 22nd (11th) daughter
 Jieyu, of the Wang clan
 Zhao Ji (b. 1127), 33rd son
 Cairen, of the Qiao clan
 Princess Xiande (b. 1111), personal name Qiaoyun, 17th (seventh) daughter
 Married Liu Wenyan
 Cairen, of the Shao clan (才人邵氏), personal name Yuannu (元奴)
 Unnamed daughter (b.1128)
Jieyu, of the Wang clan (婕妤 王氏, b. 1105)
Zhao Xiang, Duke Han (韓公 趙相; b. 1125), 32nd son
Cairen, of the Zhou clan (才人 春氏), personal name Chuntao (春桃)
Unnamed child 
Unknown
 Zhao Ji, Prince Jing (1102–1103), fourth son
 Zhao Shu, Prince Su (1103–1130), fifth son
 Zhao Cai, Prince Bin (1107–1116), tenth son
 Zhao Pu, Prince Yi (1109–1123), 13th son
 Zhao Di, Prince Xu (b. 1109), 14th son
 Zhao Gong, Prince Yun (1110–1112), 16th son
 Zhao Wo, Prince Ankang (b. 1112), 20th son
 Zhao Jian, Prince Guangping (b. 1112), 21st son
 Zhao Yue, Duke Ying (1115–1131), 24th son
 Zhao Dong, Duke Wen (b. 1119), 27th son
 Zhao Tong, Duke Yi (1121–1148), 29th son
 Zhao Bing, Duke Chang (1122–1132), 30th son
 Zhao Cong, Duke Run (b. 1123), 31st son
 Princess Shunde (1111–1137), personal name Yingluo, 18th (eighth) daughter
 Married Xiang Ziyi (b. 1111)
 Married Wanyan Zonghan (1080–1137) in 1127
 Married Wanyan Shengunai in 1137
 Princess Yifu (b. 1111), personal name Yuanzhu, 19th (ninth) daughter
 Married Wanyan Zongbi (d. 1148) and had issue. (one son)
 Princess Lingfu (b. 1118), personal name Jinyin, 30th (18th) daughter
 Married Wanyan Dan (1119–1150)
 Princess Huafu (b. 1119), personal name Saiyue, 31st (19th) daughter
 Married Wanyan Dan (1119–1150)
 Princess Qingfu (b. 1121), personal name Jingu, 32nd (20th) daughter
 Married Wanyan Dan (1119–1150)
 Princess Chunfu (b. 1124), personal name Jinling, 33rd (21st) daughter
 Married Wanyan Sheyema, the first son of Wanyan Zonghan
 Married Wang Chengdi
 Princess Gongfu, personal name Xiaojin, 34th daughter
 Princess Quanfu, 35th daughter
 Married Li Dunfu

Ancestry

See also 
 Chinese emperors family tree (middle)
 List of emperors of the Song dynasty
 Architecture of the Song dynasty
 Culture of the Song dynasty
 Economy of the Song dynasty
 History of the Song dynasty
 Society of the Song dynasty
 Technology of the Song dynasty

References

Citations

Sources 

 
 
 
 
 
 
 

 Please see: References section in the guqin article for a full list of references used in all qin related articles.

 

|-

|-

|-

 
1082 births
1135 deaths
Northern Song emperors
11th-century Chinese monarchs
12th-century Chinese monarchs
Jin dynasty (1115–1234) musicians
Song dynasty calligraphers
Song dynasty painters
Monarchs who abdicated
Monarchs taken prisoner in wartime
Guqin players
Song dynasty musicians
Chinese bird artists
Jin dynasty (1115–1234) painters
People from Kaifeng
Painters from Henan
Musicians from Henan
12th-century Chinese painters
Chinese tea masters
12th-century Chinese calligraphers
11th-century Chinese calligraphers
Heads of government who were later imprisoned